is a ski resort located in the Hirafu area of Kutchan, Abuta District, Hokkaidō, Hokkaidō, Japan.  It is a vast snow resort stretching from Niseko Annupuri’s summit (elevation 1,308.5 m) to its base, and it is famous for its fine-quality powder snow.  Because of this, Hirafu is frequented by many non-Japanese skiers and snowboarders.

For a long time, two companies operated the mountain, but in June 2004 it was arranged that the three ski resorts of the Niseko Hirafu area would be administered by the Tokyu Resort Service; Tokyu Real Estate Company, the parent company of the Tokyu Resort Service, wished to consolidate ownership to one organization.

In August 2004, it was announced that an Australian company called Japan Harmony Resort purchased the Hanazono ski area from Tokyu Real Estate.  However, so far the two have jointly administered such services as lift tickets.  Because of this relationship and the subsequent development of the whole resort, the mountain attracts a large number Australian tourists every winter.  

Niseko Higashiyama Ski Ground and Niseko Annupuri International Ski Ground are connected with Grand Hirafu at the top of the mountain, and it is possible to access all three of the slopes by using a special lift ticket called the Niseko Free Passport.

History
1923: (circa) Founded by a member of the Sapporo Railway Bureau.
1938: January 14, hosts the All-Japan Student Ski Tournament 
1961: Ski lifts completed
1993: December, electronic lift ticket system debuts (a joint venture of Fuji Electric, Kashiyama Engineering and Yamatake Honeywell) 
2003: November, electronic lift ticket system upgrades to SKIDATA
2004: Name changes to “Niseko Mt. Resort Grand Hirafu”

Open Season
The lifts run from the end of November until the beginning of May.

Access

Air
The most accessible airport in the region is New Chitose Airport.  During the skiing season, both  and  run routes directly to Hirafu from the airport.  Also, it is possible to book charter buses (such as Hokkaido Liner and White Liner) from a collaboration of tour groups.

Rail
An express Airport train runs from New Chitose Airport to Sapporo Station (or Otaru Station).
From Otaru Station on the Hakodate Main Line, the train to Kutchan Station takes approximately 78 minutes.  From Kutchan Station, a taxi ride to the resort takes approximately 15 minutes and costs about 2,600 yen (bus, approximately 20 minutes).
In open season, a special express train runs from Sapporo Station.

Car
From Sapporo
Take Route 230 (Jouzankei Highway) towards Kyōgoku 
Take Route 5
Drive on Hokkaidō Route 343 (Rankoshi~Niseko~Kutchan) for 1.5 hours
From New Chitose Airport
Take Route 276 towards Kyōgoku
Take Route 5
Take Hokkaidō Route 343 (Rankoshi~Niseko~Kutchan) for 2 hours.

Course
There are three main differentiable courses:
Alpen Course
Kougen Course
Hanazono Course

External links

 Grand Hirafu website
 Grand Hirafu website

Ski areas and resorts in Hokkaido
Tourist attractions in Hokkaido